The 1970 Iowa State Cyclones baseball team represented Iowa State University in the 1970 NCAA University Division baseball season. The Cyclones played their home games at Cap Timm Field. The team was coached by Cap Timm in his 29th year as head coach at Iowa State.

The Cyclones won the District V playoff to advance to the College World Series, where they were defeated by the Ohio Bobcats.

Roster

Schedule

|-
! style="" | Regular Season
|-

|-
! bgcolor="#DDDDFF" width="3%" | #
! bgcolor="#DDDDFF" width="7%" | Date
! bgcolor="#DDDDFF" width="14%" | Opponent
! bgcolor="#DDDDFF" width="25%" | Site/Stadium
! bgcolor="#DDDDFF" width="5%" | Score
! bgcolor="#DDDDFF" width="5%" | Overall Record
! bgcolor="#DDDDFF" width="5%" | Big 8 Record
|- align="center" bgcolor="#ccffcc"
| 1 || April 3 || vs  || Cap Timm Field • Ames, Iowa || 2–1 || 1–0 || – 
|- align="center" bgcolor="#ffcccc"
| 2 || April 3 || vs Minnesota || Cap Timm Field • Ames, Iowa || 0–5 || 1–1 || –
|- align="center" bgcolor="#ffcccc"
| 3 || April 4 || vs Minnesota || Cap Timm Field • Ames, Iowa || 0–9 || 1–2 || –
|- align="center" bgcolor="#ffcccc"
| 4 || April 4 || vs Minnesota || Cap Timm Field • Ames, Iowa || 0–5 || 1–3 || –
|- align="center" bgcolor="#ffcccc"
| 5 || April  || vs  || Unknown • Unknown || 0–1 || 1–4 || –
|- align="center" bgcolor="#ccffcc"
| 6 || April  || at  || Simmons Field • Columbia, Missouri || 1–0 || 2–4 || 1–0
|- align="center" bgcolor="#ccffcc"
| 7 || April  || at Missouri || Simmons Field • Columbia, Missouri || 5–1 || 3–4 || 2–0
|- align="center" bgcolor="#ccffcc"
| 8 || April  || at Missouri || Simmons Field • Columbia, Missouri || 16–9 || 4–4 || 3–0
|- align="center" bgcolor="#ccffcc"
| 9 || April  || vs  || Unknown • Unknown || 6–5 || 5–4 || 4–0
|- align="center" bgcolor="#ccffcc"
| 10 || April  || vs  || Unknown • Unknown || 13–2 || 6–4 || 4–0
|- align="center" bgcolor="#ccffcc"
| 11 || April 24 || at  || Unknown • Norman, Oklahoma || 8–2 || 7–4 || 5–0
|- align="center" bgcolor="#ccffcc"
| 12 || April 24 || at Oklahoma || Unknown • Norman, Oklahoma || 6–5 || 8–4 || 6–0
|- align="center" bgcolor="#ffcccc"
| 13 || April 25 || at Oklahoma || Unknown • Norman, Oklahoma || 3–7 || 8–5 || 6–1
|- align="center" bgcolor="#ccffcc"
| 14 || April 28 || vs  || Cap Timm Field • Ames, Iowa || 2–1 || 9–5 || 6–1
|-

|-
! bgcolor="#DDDDFF" width="3%" | #
! bgcolor="#DDDDFF" width="7%" | Date
! bgcolor="#DDDDFF" width="14%" | Opponent
! bgcolor="#DDDDFF" width="25%" | Site/Stadium
! bgcolor="#DDDDFF" width="5%" | Score
! bgcolor="#DDDDFF" width="5%" | Overall Record
! bgcolor="#DDDDFF" width="5%" | Big 8 Record
|- align="center" bgcolor="#ccffcc"
| 15 || May 2 ||  || Cap Timm Field • Ames, Iowa || 6–3 || 10–5 || 7–1
|- align="center" bgcolor="#ccffcc"
| 16 || May 2 || Kansas State || Cap Timm Field • Ames, Iowa || 7–5 || 11–5 || 8–1
|- align="center" bgcolor="#ccffcc"
| 17 || May 8 ||  || Cap Timm Field • Ames, Iowa || 2–1 || 12–5 || 9–1
|- align="center" bgcolor="#ffcccc"
| 18 || May 9 || Oklahoma State || Cap Timm Field • Ames, Iowa || 3–5 || 12–6 || 9–2
|- align="center" bgcolor="#ccffcc"
| 19 || May 9 || Oklahoma State || Cap Timm Field • Ames, Iowa || 4–0 || 13–6 || 10–2
|- align="center" bgcolor="#ccffcc"
| 20 || May 15 || at  || Hoglund Ballpark • Lawrence, Kansas || 3–1 || 14–6 || 11–2
|- align="center" bgcolor="#ffcccc"
| 21 || May 15 || at Kansas || Hoglund Ballpark • Lawrence, Kansas || 2–3 || 14–7 || 11–3
|- align="center" bgcolor="#ffcccc"
| 22 || May 16 || at Kansas || Hoglund Ballpark • Lawrence, Kansas || 1–2 || 14–8 || 11–4
|- align="center" bgcolor="#ccffcc"
| 23 || May 20 ||  || Cap Timm Field • Ames, Iowa || 4–1 || 15–8 || 12–4
|- align="center" bgcolor="#ffcccc"
| 24 || May 20 || Nebraska || Cap Timm Field • Ames, Iowa || 0–2 || 15–9 || 12–5
|- align="center" bgcolor="#ccffcc"
| 25 || May 21 || Nebraska || Cap Timm Field • Ames, Iowa || 9–3 || 16–9 || 13–5
|-

|-
! style="" | Postseason
|-

|-
! bgcolor="#DDDDFF" width="3%" | #
! bgcolor="#DDDDFF" width="7%" | Date
! bgcolor="#DDDDFF" width="14%" | Opponent
! bgcolor="#DDDDFF" width="25%" | Site/Stadium
! bgcolor="#DDDDFF" width="5%" | Score
! bgcolor="#DDDDFF" width="5%" | Overall Record
! bgcolor="#DDDDFF" width="5%" | Big 8 Record
|- align="center" bgcolor="#ccffcc"
| 26 || May 31 ||  || Cap Timm Field • Ames, Iowa || 7–6 || 17–9 || 13–5
|- align="center" bgcolor="#ccffcc"
| 27 || June 1 || Tulsa || Cap Timm Field • Ames, Iowa || 4–0 || 18–9 || 13–5
|-

|-
! bgcolor="#DDDDFF" width="3%" | #
! bgcolor="#DDDDFF" width="7%" | Date
! bgcolor="#DDDDFF" width="14%" | Opponent
! bgcolor="#DDDDFF" width="25%" | Site/Stadium
! bgcolor="#DDDDFF" width="5%" | Score
! bgcolor="#DDDDFF" width="5%" | Overall Record
! bgcolor="#DDDDFF" width="5%" | Big 8 Record
|- align="center" bgcolor="#ffcccc"
| 28 || June 13 || vs Dartmouth || Johnny Rosenblatt Stadium • Omaha, Nebraska || 6–7 || 18–10 || 13–5
|- align="center" bgcolor="#ccffcc"
| 29 || June 14 || vs Arizona || Johnny Rosenblatt Stadium • Omaha, Nebraska || 7–1 || 19–10 || 13–5
|- align="center" bgcolor="#ffcccc"
| 30 || June 15 || vs  || Johnny Rosenblatt Stadium • Omaha, Nebraska || 6–9 || 19–11 || 13–5
|-

|-
|

Awards and honors 
Jerry Lundin
 All-Tournament Team

References

Iowa State Cyclones baseball seasons
Iowa State Cyclones baseball
College World Series seasons
Big Eight Conference baseball champion seasons
Iowa State